1988 Emperor's Cup Final was the 68th final of the Emperor's Cup competition. The final was played at National Stadium in Tokyo on January 1, 1989. Nissan Motors won the championship.

Overview
Nissan Motors won their 3rd title, by defeating Fujita Industries 3–1. Nissan Motors was featured a squad consisting of many international footballers Shigetatsu Matsunaga, Shinji Tanaka, Toru Sano, Hiroshi Hirakawa, Tetsuji Hashiratani, Kazushi Kimura, Koichi Hashiratani and Kenta Hasegawa.

Match details

See also
1988 Emperor's Cup

References

Emperor's Cup
1988 in Japanese football
Yokohama F. Marinos matches
Shonan Bellmare matches